Adrian Holmes (30 May 1925 – 8 January 2014) was an Australian boxer. He competed in the men's light heavyweight event at the 1948 Summer Olympics.

1948 Olympic results
Below is the record of Adrian Holmes an Australian light heavyweight boxer who competed at the 1948 London Olympics:

 Round of 32: bye
 Round of 16: defeated Mohamed El-Minabawi (Egypt) by second-round knockout
 Quarterfinal: defeated Hugh O'Hagan (Ireland) on points
 Semifinal: lost to Don Scott (Great Britain) on points
 Bronze Medal Bout: lost to Mario Cia (Argentina) referee stopped contest in third round

References

External links
 

1925 births
2014 deaths
Australian male boxers
Olympic boxers of Australia
Boxers at the 1948 Summer Olympics
Light-heavyweight boxers